Bush Pass is a mountain pass in the Canadian Rockies, on the border between the Canadian provinces of Alberta and British Columbia. It is located at the headwaters of the Valenciennes River, formerly known as the South Fork Bush River; the North Fork Bush River is now known as the Bush River.

See also
List of mountain passes

References

Banff National Park
Canadian Rockies
Mountain passes of British Columbia
Columbia Country
Borders of Alberta
Borders of British Columbia